Religion and Gun Practice: The Way of the West is a 1913 American silent Western film directed by William Duncan and starring Tom Mix, Rex De Rosselli and Myrtle Stedman. Among other roles in similar films at the time, Tom Mix's role in Religion and Gun Practice established what would be the cowboy hero of the twentieth century. The movie was played in theaters across the nation.

Plot 
Tom Mix plays "a western outlaw reformed by a missionary's daughter." Kill Kullen and the missionary's daughter, Winona Judell, fall in love. She sets him back on the path of righteousness, and though her father disapproves of their desire to marry each other, she is persistent. Kill Kullen teaches her how to ride and shoot, and her father eventually yields.

Filming 
The movie was filmed by William Duncan and the Selig Polyscope Company in the facilities of what used to be the Lubin Film Company studio, in Prescott, Arizona. The location provided a landscape of hills and valleys, forest, and desert wasteland ("Slaughter House Gulch"), as well as iconic rock formations.

Cast
 Tom Mix as Kill Kullen
 Rex De Rosselli as Wesley Judell
 Myrtle Stedman as Winona Judell
 Lester Cuneo as Finley Overmeyer
 Old Blue as Kullen's Horse (uncredited)

References

External links
 

1913 films
1913 Western (genre) films
American silent short films
American black-and-white films
Films directed by William Duncan
Selig Polyscope Company films
Silent American Western (genre) films
1910s English-language films
1910s American films